Twilight series may refer to:

 Twilight (novel series), a novel series by Stephenie Meyer. 
 The Twilight Saga (film series), a film series adapted from the novels by Stephenie Meyer.